The Greeks in Denmark are a small community. , Statistics Denmark recorded 1,180 people of Greek origin living in Denmark, with 954 in Zealand, 177 in Jutland, 48 in Funen, and 1 in Bornholm.

History
Unskilled migrants began coming from Evros and Kastoria to Denmark in the 1960s; they worked primarily in the fur trade. Most of those initial migrants have returned to Greece as this sector became economically depressed. Political refugees fleeing the Greek military junta of 1967–1974 were numerically minor, but evoked a great deal of sympathy from the politically liberal Danish population. The number of Greek international students choosing Denmark as their destination showed an uptick after 1981, when Greece became a member of the European Economic Community.

Gender issues
Many migrants consist of Greek men in international marriages with Danish women. The number of Greek women married to Danish men is smaller. Either way, such relationships have an unusually high rate of divorce. Spouses typically return to Greece if they separate from their Danish partner.

See also 
Denmark–Greece relations

References

Notes

Sources

Further reading

Ethnic groups in Denmark
Denmark
Denmark
Danish people of Greek descent